Josh Hall may refer to:

Sports
Josh Hall (baseball) (born 1980), American baseball player
Josh Hall (basketball) (born 2000), American basketball player
Josh Hall (footballer) (born 1990), Australian rules footballer and former high jumper

Others
Josh Hall (sailor) (born 1962), British yachtsman
Josh Hall (One Life to Live), a fictional character on the American soap opera

See also
Joshua Hall (disambiguation)